Flaiano is a crater on Mercury. Its name was adopted by the International Astronomical Union (IAU) on March 15, 2013. Flaiano is named for the Italian writer Ennio Flaiano.

Hollows are present in the northeast quadrant of Flaiano.

Flaiano lies near the center of the Raphael basin, and is adjacent to an area of high albedo.

References

Impact craters on Mercury